Erosi Manjgaladze Stadium is a multi-use stadium in Samtredia, Georgia. It is used mostly for football matches and hosts the home games of FC Samtredia of the Umaglesi Liga.   The capacity of the stadium is 15,000 spectators.  The stadium is named after the late Georgian actor Erosi Manjgaladze, who was born in Samtredia.

External links
 Stadium information

Football venues in Georgia (country)
Buildings and structures in Imereti
FC Samtredia